The Buru cuckooshrike (Coracina fortis) is a species of bird in the family Campephagidae.
It is endemic to Indonesia.

Its natural habitats are subtropical or tropical moist lowland forests and subtropical or tropical moist montane forests.
It is threatened by habitat loss.

References

Buru cuckooshrike
Birds of Buru
Buru cuckooshrike
Taxonomy articles created by Polbot